The 2009 Grand Prix motorcycle racing season was the 61st F.I.M. Road Racing World Championship season. The season consisted out of 17 races for the MotoGP class and 16 for the 125cc and 250cc classes, beginning with the Qatar motorcycle Grand Prix on 12 April 2009 and ending with the Valencian Community motorcycle Grand Prix on 8 November.

Preseason

Cost-cutting measures
As announced during 2008, MotoGP class switched to a single-tyre manufacturer. The move was made to try to improve safety by reducing cornering speeds, and in a marginal way for cost reasons; the winner was decided by bid. Michelin, one of the two tyre suppliers in 2008, decided not to bid for the supply, effectively declaring Bridgestone the winner, which was confirmed on 18 October 2008. Bridgestone will be the sole tyre supplier from 2009 to 2011. Only race spec tyres will be provided to the teams, eliminating qualifying tyres, in use until 2008.

Other cost-cutting manoeuvers were made during the winter prior to the season, to try to contain the rising costs of the sport, especially during a period of economic downturn. FIM was especially concerned, fearing that defections among private and factory teams could leave the grid with 14 bikes only.

After negotiations between FIM, Dorna and MSMA (the manufacturers' association), new measures were adopted. The Friday morning free practice session was eliminated, limiting the Friday practice time to a single 45-minute session (later brought to a 1-hour session from the French GP onwards); a limit of 5 engines was imposed for the last 7 races, with a 10-point penalty for each additional engine used; ceramic composite materials for brakes were banned; electronic assistance was reduced with the ban of electronic controlled suspensions and launch control systems; Monday tests will be cancelled except for Catalunya and Brno, where only test riders will be allowed to take part.

Kawasaki withdrawal and return
With a somewhat unexpected announcement, Kawasaki made public its intention to withdraw from MotoGP immediately on 9 January 2009, citing the global economic downturn as the main cause of the decision. Initial negotiations between Dorna and Kawasaki aimed to run the two bikes with the private Aspar team, but after further talks, on 26 February 2009 Kawasaki announced its decision to remain in the category, running a single bike team with Marco Melandri, effectively leaving John Hopkins without a contract. The team ran under the Hayate Racing banner, as announced on 1 March 2009.

Season review

MotoGP
Valentino Rossi won his sixth MotoGP title, seventh in the top class and ninth title in total after getting the better of teammate Jorge Lorenzo in a season-long battle. The season was marked by the dominance of Yamaha duo Rossi and Lorenzo, with occasional wins for Dani Pedrosa and Casey Stoner. Riding the factory Ducati, 2007 champion Stoner won the opener in Qatar as well as a rain-hit race in Italy to open up a championship lead after six rounds. Inconsistent handling from the Ducati as well as health problems for Stoner causing fatigue saw him drop out of the title fight by mid-season, whereas Pedrosa and Lorenzo crashed more often than Rossi who built up a sizeable lead to win the title.

250cc class

In the final 250cc championship (it was replaced by the Moto2 class in 2010), Hiroshi Aoyama became the third Japanese rider to win that title, after Tetsuya Harada and Daijiro Kato.

125cc class

In the 125cc class, Julián Simón won the title after taking seven victories during the season.

2009 Grand Prix season calendar
The following Grands Prix were scheduled to take place in 2009:

The 2009 revised race schedule was released on 24 October 2008. A Hungarian round was originally scheduled for 20 September 2009 but the organizers asked Dorna to postpone the event to 2010 due to delays in the construction of the Balatonring circuit.

Due to adverse weather conditions, the Qatar MotoGP race was postponed until 13 April.

 ‡ = Night race, MotoGP race held on Monday because of rainfall on Sunday.
 † = MotoGP class only
 †† = Saturday race

Calendar changes
 The Japanese Grand Prix was moved forward, from 28 September to 26 April.
 The Portuguese Grand Prix was moved back, from 13 April to 4 October.
 The Chinese Grand Prix was taken off the calendar due to a dire spectator attendance, poor promotion and an overall lack of commercial interest in the venue.
 The British Grand Prix was moved back, from 22 June to 26 July.
 Only the MotoGP class raced during the United States Grand Prix because of a Californian law on air pollution, preventing the 125 and 250cc classes from racing.

Regulation changes
The following changes are made to the regulation for the 2009 season:

Sporting regulations

A big overhaul has been made to the standard time schedule for all days. The Friday morning Free Practice session will be cancelled for all three classes and the three MotoGP Practice Sessions, as well as Saturday Qualifying, will be shortened from one hour to 45 minutes. Warm-Up times and Race distances are not altered.

For the Free Practice one sessions on Friday, the times are now as follows:
FP1 from 13:05 to 13:45 for the 125cc class.
FP1 from 14:05 to 14:50 for the MotoGP class.
FP1 from 15:05 to 15:50 for the 250cc class.

For the Free Practice two and Qualifying Practice sessions on Saturday, the times are now as follows:
FP2 from 09:05 to 09:45 for the 125cc class.
FP2 from 10:05 to 10:50 for the MotoGP class.
FP2 from 11:05 to 11:50 for the 250cc class.
QP from 13:05 to 13:45 for the 125cc class.
QP from 14:05 to 14:50 for the MotoGP class.
QP from 15:05 to 15:50 for the 250cc class.

For the Warm-Up and Race sessions on Sunday, the times are now as follows:
WUP from 08:40 to 09:00 for the 125cc class.
WUP from 09:10 to 09:30 for the MotoGP class.
WUP from 09:40 to 10:00 for the 250cc class.
Race from 11:00 to 12:00 for the 125cc class.
Race from 12:15 to 13:15 for the 250cc class.
Race from 14:00 to 15:00 for the MotoGP class.

Only two post-race tests are now allowed. The circuits chosen are the Catalan and Czech ones and the tests are only allowed if they are for development purposes and if test riders are used.

These rules were additionally added on the 25th of July 2009:

 The rules for practice restrictions have been updated. For the purpose of practice restrictions, the year is split into two parts: the season itself and the winter. The season is defined as 'the period starting fourteen days before the first race of the year and ending two days after the last race of the year, both dates being inclusive'. The winter is defined as 'the rest of the year, starting four days after the last race of the season and ending fifteen days before the first race of the next season, both dates being inclusive.'
 Using riders under contract to practice with MotoGP bikes is not allowed during the season as well as the breaks at any track included on the current year's calendar. The following exceptions to this rule apply if:
The practice is added to the event schedule.
The practice happens during the day(s) immediately after the race at three circuits, at the circuit where the race has occurred. The final race of the season will always be held at one of the three circuits and will be the only two-day test which is allowed. The others will only consist out of one test day. The other two circuits must be nominated by the Grand Prix Commission by 31 January of that year.
The activity has been specifically approved by the Race Direction.

The same goes for the winter period. It is forbidden to use contracted riders to practice with MotoGP at any circuit. The following exceptions apply to this rule if:

There's a maximum of six days where Dorna/IRTA organise official tests at tracks which were added to the calendars of the previous or next year. No testing is allowed during the period between 1 December of one year and 31 January of the next year, both dates being inclusive. The winter test schedule must be approved the Grand Prix Commission.
The activity has been specifically approved by the Race Direction.

Rules for the practice by non-contracted riders have been changed. The practice by non-contracted or test riders is permitted at any circuit at all times, but is limited specifically by the use of a maximum of 240 tyres per manufacturer, per calendar year, which is solely supplied by the MotoGP tyre supplier. There is an exception to this rule however and it is forbidden to test during the season and the breaks at a circuit included on the calendar before the race there has happened. Nonetheless, manufacturers can designate and inform the Race Direction of the two circuits where they can test before 31 January of each year, but not within fourteen days of the scheduled event at the circuits. Said schedule of these tests and any following amendments must have to be told to the Race Direction at least seven days ahead of time.

The definition of a 'contracted rider' and a 'rookie rider' have been clarified. A contracted rider is a rider who has ridden in nine or more events during a single season. A rookie is a rider who is submitted by a participating team for participation in the full season but is not a contracted rider as is defined in the same class in any past season. For the purpose of this section, the old 500cc and MotoGP class are considered to be the same as well as the current 250cc, which will be renamed to the Moto2 class in 2010.

This rule was additionally added on the 24th of August 2009:

 All the MotoGP Practice and Qualifying sessions are going to be extended again, from 45 minutes to one hour as of the French Grand Prix onwards.

Technical regulations

 In September 2008, it was decided that from 2009 onwards there will only be a single tyre manufacturer for the MotoGP class. Proposals could be sent in to the FIM and Dorna until 3 October 2008 after which the eventual winner were to be announced by the Grand Prix Commission on 18 October 2008. Bridgestone sent in a bid whilst supplying rival Michelin, did not. The eventual proposal was studied and on 18 October, it was announced that Bridgestone were to become the sole tyre supplier for a three-year period.
 From the Czech Republic GP onwards, a maximum of five engines will only be allowed for use in the final eight races of the season. Changing parts is not allowed, with the exception of daily maintenance.
 Composite materials made out of ceramic is now forbidden to use on the brake discs or pads.
 A launch control system is now prohibited.
 A suspension which is controlled by electronics is now prohibited as well.

These rules were additionally added on the 25th of July 2009:

 Rules on the engine durability have been greatly extended. In the MotoGP class, the number of available engines to use for all riders is limited. For 2009, a maximum of five engines for the final seven scheduled races of the season starting from the 2009 Czech Grand Prix until the end of the season. If a rider is replaced for any given reason, the replacement rider will be considered as the original rider so that the engine can be granted. The available engines for the exclusive use of each rider has to marked and sealed by the Technical Director before it can be used. The team has the responsibility to register any new engine with the Technical Directed before it can be used. Once it is registered and used for the first time, the engines can not be swapped between riders even if they are from the same team. A new engine is considered to be used when the bike with said engine crosses the transponder timing point at the pitlane exit. The engines will be sealed via wiring and identification tabs so that:
The timing system is not within each. For example, the head cover has to be wired to the cylinder head.
The timing driving system is not within each. For example, the geartrain/chain cover is wired so that it can't be taken off.
The cylinder head as well as the cylinder block (if there are any) can't be removed from the engine. For example, the cylinder head is wired to the cylinder block and the cylinder block is wired to the engine crankcase.
 - The crankcase can't be opened. For example, the crankcase halves are wired together.

Teams are allowed to replace all the parts which can be accessed without having to remove the sealing wiring. If the sealing wiring is broken or removed without direction by the Technical Direction, the engine will be considered "rebuilt" and engines with broken or missing security seals will be treated as a wholly new engine in the allocation. If a competitor, for any reason (mechanical failure, crash, major damage and so on) has to use another engine above their allocation, the Technical Director has to be informed before said engine can be used so that the Race Direction can apply the proper penalty. The damaged engine will be removed from the allocation and, if it is to be used again, will be treated as a new engine with the fitting penalty applied. There is no limit to the number of times a sealed, allocated engine can be fitted to and used in a bike, on the condition that the security seal is not broken or removed. Replacing an engine with another sealed engine, be it new or used, from the rider's allocation is allowed and no penalty shall be given if done. To prevent the running of a used, allocated engine outside of any MotoGP races, all the allocated engines will have security seals placed over either the exhaust or inlet ports (on at least one cylinder bank if the engine is a V-type) before it can leave the circuit. If a team wants to re-use such an allocated an sealed engine, it must first request to the Technical Director to remove all security seals. If the Technical Director or his staff discover that the security seals are not intact, the engine will be branded as a new engine in the allocation and a penalty will be handed out.

 Any Exhaust Gas Recirculation (also known as EGR) systems are now prohibited.
 It is forbidden to use any hydraulic and/or pneumatic pressurised powered systems, the exception being cylinder inlet/exhaust valve springs. All hydraulic systems on the bike have to be powered only by the manual inputs of the rider. Normal hydraulic hand and foot controls such as master/slave cylinders for the brakes and clutch are allowed, as are pneumatic engine valve actuating systems and oil and water pumps for entine lubricating and cooling. Using engine lubricating oil for any motive other than lubrication and cooling (such as powered hydraulic systems) is forbidden.
 All bikes must have a minimum of one brake on each wheel which operates in an independent way.
 In the 125cc and 250cc classes, brake discs which consist out of ferrous materials only are permitted.
 In all classes, materials made out of ceramic composite are not allowed for the brake discs or the brake pads. Ceramic materials are defined as 'inorganic, non metallic solids (for example: Al2O3, SiC, B4C, Ti5Si3, SiO2 and Si3N4)'.
 Electric and electronic controlled suspension and steering damper systems are forbidden. Changes to the suspension and steering damper systems can only be made via manual inputs and mechanical/hydraulic changes.
 Racing numbers have to be attached to the front as well as both sides of the bike. For the MotoGP class, only the front number is required.
 Numbers should have a height of at least 140 mm.
 Numbers have to be clearly readable and strongly differ from the background colour.
 Backgrounds have to be of a single colour over a large enough area to provide a minimum clear area of 25 mm around the number.
 In the case of a dispute over the readability of numbers, the decision taken by the Technical Direction will be concluding.

2009 Grand Prix season results

 ‡ = Night race, MotoGP race held on Monday because of rainfall on Sunday.
 † = MotoGP class only
 †† = Saturday Race

Participants
All entries taken from the official MotoGP site.

MotoGP participants

 All entries used Bridgestone tyres.

250cc participants

 With the exception of Japanese wildcard riders, who used Bridgestone, all entries used Dunlop tyres.

125cc participants

 All entries used Dunlop tyres.

Standings

MotoGP riders' standings
Scoring system
Points were awarded to the top fifteen finishers. Rider had to finish the race to earn points.

 Rounds marked with a light blue background were under wet race conditions or stopped by rain.
 Riders marked with light blue background were eligible for Rookie of the Year awards.

250cc riders' standings
Scoring system
Points were awarded to the top fifteen finishers. Rider had to finish the race to earn points.

 Rounds marked with a light blue background were under wet race conditions or stopped by rain.
 Riders marked with light blue background were eligible for Rookie of the Year awards.

125cc riders' standings
Scoring system
Points were awarded to the top fifteen finishers. Rider had to finish the race to earn points.

 Rounds marked with a light blue background were under wet race conditions or stopped by rain.
 Riders marked with light blue background were eligible for Rookie of the Year awards.

† Half-points awarded in Qatar, as the riders did not complete the sufficient distance for full points.

Constructors' standings
Scoring system
Points were awarded to the top fifteen finishers. A rider had to finish the race to earn points.
 

 Each constructor gets the same number of points as their best placed rider in each race.
 Rounds marked with a light blue background were under wet race conditions or stopped by rain.

MotoGP

† Following Loris Capirossi's engine change, Suzuki was given a ten-point penalty in the constructors' championship at the Australian Grand Prix because of the new for 2009 MotoGP engine change limit rule which restricts each rider to five engines for the final seven rounds.

250cc

125cc

† Half-points awarded in Qatar, as the riders did not complete the sufficient distance for full points.

Teams' standings
 Each team gets the total points scored by their two riders, including replacement riders. In one rider team, only the points scored by that rider will be counted. Wildcard riders do not score points.
 Rounds marked with a light blue background were under wet race conditions or stopped by rain.

MotoGP

References

Sources

 
Grand Prix motorcycle racing seasons
2009 in motorcycle sport